Clifford Birkett (17 September 1933 – 11 January 1997) was an English footballer who played in the Football League as a forward for Manchester United and Southport. He was a schoolboy international. He also played non-league football for Cromptons Recreation, Wigan Rovers and Macclesfield Town.

Birkett was born in Haydock, Lancashire, in 1933 and died there in 1997 at the age of 63. Two brothers, Ronnie and Wilf, were also professional footballers.

References

External links
MUFCInfo.com profile

1933 births
1997 deaths
People from Haydock
English footballers
England schools international footballers
Association football forwards
Manchester United F.C. players
Southport F.C. players
Wigan Rovers F.C. players
Macclesfield Town F.C. players
English Football League players